Pedro Astray López (born 18 March 1992) is a Spanish footballer who plays as a central midfielder for Zamora CF.

Club career
Born in Vitoria-Gasteiz, Álava, Basque Country Astray joined Atlético Madrid's youth setup in 2005, aged 13. He made his senior debuts with the C-team in the 2011–12 season, in Tercera División.

In August 2013, the free agent Astray signed for CU Collado Villalba, also in the fourth division. On 31 January 2014 he moved to Getafe CF B, in Segunda División B.

On 7 January 2015 Astray played his first match with the main squad, coming on as a second half substitute for Diego Castro in a 1–1 away draw against UD Almería, for the campaign's Copa del Rey.

References

External links

1992 births
Living people
Footballers from Vitoria-Gasteiz
Spanish footballers
Association football midfielders
Segunda División B players
Tercera División players
Atlético Madrid C players
CU Collado Villalba players
Getafe CF B players
Getafe CF footballers
UD San Sebastián de los Reyes players
CD Guadalajara (Spain) footballers
CDA Navalcarnero players
Xerez Deportivo FC footballers
Gimnástica Segoviana CF footballers
UA Horta players
Zamora CF footballers
Slovak Super Liga players
FK Senica players
Oberliga (football) players
Stuttgarter Kickers players
Spanish expatriate footballers
Spanish expatriate sportspeople in Slovakia
Spanish expatriate sportspeople in Germany
Expatriate footballers in Slovakia
Expatriate footballers in Germany